The Col de Jambaz is a mountain pass in the Chablais Alps in the Haute-Savoie department of France.

Jambaz
Jambaz
Landforms of Haute-Savoie